Barry Douglas(s) is the name of:
 Barry Douglas (pianist) (born 1960), classical pianist and conductor
 Barry Douglas (footballer) (born 1989), Scottish footballer
 Barry Douglas (professional wrestler) real name Doug de Relswykow, grandson of Olympic wrestler George de Relwyskow

See also